= Residential zone =

Residential zone can refer to:

- Residential area, an area zoned for residential development
- Residential zoning, the practice of designating an area for residential development
